Sefidmorad (also Romanized as Sefīdmorād) is a village in Howmeh Rural District, in the Central District of Kahnuj County, Kerman Province, Iran. At the 2006 census, its population was 627, in 158 families.

References 

Populated places in Kahnuj County